Sarah Billmeier is an American para-alpine skier. She represented the United States in alpine skiing at the 1992, 1994, 1998 and 2002 Winter Paralympics. In total she won seven gold medals, five silver medals and one bronze medal.

She competed in LW2 events for athletes with a single leg amputation above the knee. She lost her left leg above the knee to bone cancer when she was five years old.

Achievements

See also 
 List of Paralympic medalists in alpine skiing

References

External links 
 

Living people
Year of birth missing (living people)
Place of birth missing (living people)
Paralympic alpine skiers of the United States
American female alpine skiers
Alpine skiers at the 1992 Winter Paralympics
Alpine skiers at the 1994 Winter Paralympics
Alpine skiers at the 1998 Winter Paralympics
Alpine skiers at the 2002 Winter Paralympics
Medalists at the 1992 Winter Paralympics
Medalists at the 1994 Winter Paralympics
Medalists at the 1998 Winter Paralympics
Medalists at the 2002 Winter Paralympics
Paralympic gold medalists for the United States
Paralympic silver medalists for the United States
Paralympic bronze medalists for the United States
Paralympic medalists in alpine skiing
American amputees
21st-century American women